Yip Pin Xiu  (born 10 January 1992) is a Singaporean backstroke swimmer. She is a five-time Paralympic gold medallist and 5 time World Champion, with two world records in the 50 m backstroke S2 and the 100 m backstroke S2. Yip is Singapore's most decorated Paralympian.

Most recently during the Para Swimming World Series Australia 2023, Yip clinched the gold medal in the Women's 100m backstroke multi-class event. She later also bagged her second gold medal in the Women's 50m backstroke on the final day of the competition.

She has Charcot-Marie-Tooth syndrome and competes in the S2 category for the physically impaired. Since 2005, she has won medals in international competitions such as the World Wheelchair and Amputee Games, Japan Paralympic Swimming Championships and International German Paralympic Swimming Championships. At the 2008 Summer Paralympics, she won a gold medal in the 50 metres backstroke and a silver medal in the 50 metres freestyle, setting world records in both events. At the 2016 Summer Paralympics, she won a gold medal in the 100 metres S2 backstroke, setting a world record for that event, and another for her 50 m split.

In 2009, she was named "Young Woman Achiever of the Year" by local magazine Her World. In honour of her feats at the Paralympic Games, she was conferred the Pingat Jasa Gemilang (Meritorious Service Medal) during the National Day Awards ceremony in 2016. More recently, Yip was crowned Sportswoman of the Year (swimming) at the Singapore Disablility Sports Awards 2022. This was her third time earning this honour, having won the same award in 2019 and 2021. Her achievements have contributed to the widespread recognition of disabled athletes in the Singaporean public sphere.

Early life and education
Yip Pin Xiu was born on 10 January 1992, being the youngest of three children in her family.

At birth, Yip was not born with atrophy of her limbs. Her symptoms only appeared when she was two years old. Due to her aunt witnessing her unable to extend and rotate her ankles, her family brought her to a doctor and she initially diagnosed it as muscular dystrophy. When Yip was five, she started swimming to improve her health and strengthen her muscles; nevertheless, by the age of thirteen, she had lost her ability to walk and had to use a wheelchair.

As a student, Yip first studied in Ai Tong Primary School and Bendemeer Secondary School, before she graduated from Republic Polytechnic as back-up valedictorian and, as of 2017, Yip graduated from Singapore Management University with a Bachelor of Social Science.

Swimming career

Early years
Yip started swimming competitively when she was twelve years old. After losing her ability to kick, Yip switched from the front crawl to the backstroke and was reclassified from the S5 to the S2 category (lower numbers indicate more severe disabilities). Her previous coach was former Singaporean Olympic swimmer Ang Peng Siong, while fellow Paralympic swimmer Theresa Goh is her close friend and role model. Besides swimming, Yip has participated in events to raise awareness of disabled sports, such as the Interschool Swimming Meets and Sengkang Primary School Track and Field Meet 2007.

After successes in national championships, Yip participated in the Asia Paralympics Swimming Championship 2005, winning two gold medals. Her first international competition was the World Wheelchair and Amputee Games 2005, where she won two gold medals and a bronze. She then received four gold medals at the DSE Long Course Swimming Championships in 2006. In 2007, she won three gold medals at the Japan Paralympic Swimming Championships and four gold medals at the World Wheelchair and Amputee Games.

2008 Asian Paralympics
At the 4th ASEAN Para Games, Yip finished first in the women's 150 metres individual medley, clocking 4 minutes 56.34 seconds. She set a world record time of 1 minute 00.80 seconds in the 50 metres backstroke at the US Paralympic swimming trials. The 22nd International German Paralympic Swimming Championships saw her set a world record of 2 minutes 10.09 seconds in the 100 metres backstroke heats; in the finals, she was awarded the gold medal with a time of 2 minutes 08.09 seconds, bettering her own world record.

2008 Summer Paralympics 

Yip started her 2008 Summer Paralympic Games campaign by breaking another world record, clocking 57.04 seconds in the women's 50 metres freestyle heats. However, she was narrowly beaten by Mexican swimmer Patricia Valle in the finals, clinching a silver medal with a time of 57.43 seconds. In the women's 50 metres backstroke heats, she posted a time of 57.92 seconds, taking two seconds off her own world record. She then swam the women's 50 metres backstroke finals in a time of 58.75 seconds to win the gold medal. After she returned to Singapore, the president conferred Yip a state medal, the Meritorious Service Medal.

The success of Yip and Laurentia Tan, who won two bronze medals in equestrian events, sparked public debate about the treatment and recognition of disabled athletes in Singapore. Letters to The Straits Times criticised the poor coverage of the Paralympics. Many Singaporeans also commented about the disparity of the cash awards handed out by the government: S$1,000,000 for an Olympic gold and S$100,000 for a Paralympic gold. When the issues were raised in Parliament, MCYS parliamentary secretary Teo Ser Luck promised to study plans to give disabled athletes greater support and to include them in sporting programmes such as Project 0812, a training programme for top Singaporean sportspeople. Two months later, the cash rewards for Paralympic medals were doubled and funding for the Singapore National Paralympic Council was increased.

2015 Asian Paralympics
At the 8th ASEAN Para Games in 2015, she was the torch lighter with Tay Wei Ming and Gan Kai Hong Aloysius.

2016 Summer Paralympics
Yip participated in the 2016 Summer Paralympics. On 10 September 2016, Yip swam in the finals of the 100 m backstroke, S2 class; her time of 2:07.09 was a new S2 world record, earning her a Paralympic gold medal. Her 59.38 split for the first 50 m of the race was also a new S2 world record; in both cases she overwrote her own world leading times. Her medal was Singapore's first at the 2016 Summer Paralympics. On 16 September, Yip won her (and Singapore's) second gold medal of the 2016 Games, this time in the 50 m backstroke finals, S2 class with a time of 1:00.33.

2018 Asian Paralympics
Yip also participated in the 2018 Asian Para Games, and won one gold medal and two bronze medals in total. On 8 October, she won her first gold medal for the 50 m backstroke, S1-4 class, and on 9 October, her first bronze medal for the 100 m freestyle, S1-4 class event. On 12 October, she won her second bronze medal on the 50 m freestyle, S1-4 class event with a time of 1:04.68, behind Peng Qiuping of China and Gabidullina Zulfiya of Kazakhstan, with times of 43.48s and 45.51s, respectively.

2020 Summer Paralympics
Yip participated in the 2020 Tokyo Paralympics. She won two gold medals, the women's 100m backstroke S2 and the women's 50m backstroke S2.

Her current coach is ex-Olympian and current Nominated Member of Parliament, Mark Chay.

Political career
On 17 September 2018, Yip became a Nominated Member of Parliament (NMP) to the Singapore Parliament. Her term began on 22 September 2018, before she sworn into Parliament on 1 October 2018. Her term lasted approximately two years, serving until 23 June 2020.

Post swimming career 
Yip is currently serving on the Athlete Committee of the World Anti-Doping Agency as of 1 January 2022.

Personal life 
In February 2022, Yip was awarded the President's Award for Inspiring Achievement; the first person to have been awarded this category in recognition of her contributions to sports and community work.

Honours
 Pingat Jasa Gemilang (Meritorious Service Medal)

See also
Singapore at the Paralympics

References

External links 

 

Living people
World record holders in paralympic swimming
1992 births
Singaporean people of Cantonese descent
People with muscular dystrophy
Republic Polytechnic alumni
Recipients of the Pingat Jasa Gemilang
Paralympic swimmers of Singapore
Swimmers at the 2008 Summer Paralympics
Swimmers at the 2012 Summer Paralympics
Swimmers at the 2016 Summer Paralympics
Paralympic silver medalists for Singapore
Paralympic gold medalists for Singapore
Medalists at the 2008 Summer Paralympics
Medalists at the 2016 Summer Paralympics
Singaporean women in politics
Medalists at the World Para Swimming Championships
Paralympic medalists in swimming
Singapore Management University alumni
Singaporean female freestyle swimmers
Singaporean female backstroke swimmers
S2-classified Paralympic swimmers
21st-century Singaporean women
Medalists at the 2018 Asian Para Games